The 1867 Wisconsin gubernatorial election was held on November 5, 1867. Incumbent Republican Party Governor Lucius Fairchild won re-election with nearly 52% of the vote, defeating Democratic candidate John J. Tallmadge.

Democratic Party
John J. Tallmadge was a businessman and the former mayor of Milwaukee, having left office less than a year before the 1867 election.  Prior to his two terms as mayor, he was one of the founders of the Milwaukee Chamber of Commerce and served as its president in 1863 and 1864.

Republican Party
Lucius Fairchild was the incumbent governor of Wisconsin, having been elected in the 1865 election.  Prior to his election as governor, he was Wisconsin Secretary of State for one term.  Fairchild had also been a Union Army officer in the American Civil War, having served as a colonel in the famous Iron Brigade when they participated in fierce fighting at Gettysburg.  Fairchild lost an arm due to wounds sustained at Gettysburg, and was later awarded an honorary promotion to brigadier general.

Results

| colspan="6" style="text-align:center;background-color: #e9e9e9;"| General Election, November 5, 1867

References

1867
Wisconsin